Mercedes Serafina Núñez de Villavicencio y Ortiz (better known as Serafina Núñez; 14 August 1913 – June 2006) was a Cuban teacher and poet who first gained recognition in the 1930s. During her literary life, she was a contemporary of Alfonso Reyes, Gabriela Mistral and Juan Ramón Jiménez, as well as other women poets of this era such as Emilia Bernal, Dulce Maria Loynaz, Carilda Oliver Labra and Rafaela Chacón Nardi.

Life
Serafina Núñez was born in Havana, Cuba, on 14 August 1913. She graduated as a normalist teacher in Havana in 1936 and then began her studies in pedagogy at the University of Havana in 1949, ending in the third year when she began working as a primary school teacher until 1969. Núñez was first published in 1936, when her work was included in Juan Ramón Jiménez's anthology Antología de la Poesía Cubana en 1936, and he maintained a friendship with Núñez the rest of his life, to the point of defraying the expense of publishing Mar Cautiva (1937), and Vigilia y Secreto (1942). It would be more than 30 years before she published again in 1992. In 2001, she visited Miami as a guest at the International Book Fair. She died in June 2006 at the age of 92 years.

Selected works
 1936: Antología de la Poesía Cubana en 1936 
 1937: Mar Cautiva
 1938: Isla en el sueño 
 1942: Vigilia y Secreto 
 1956: Paisaje y Elegía 
 1994: Vitral del tiempo – Premio Nacional de Crítica Literaria (National Critics Prize)
 1995: Moradas para la vida
 1996: Porque es vivir un testimonio raro
 1999: En las serenas márgenes
 2000: Antología cósmica de Serafina Núñez
 2000: Rosa de mi mansedumbre
 2001: El herido diamante
 2002: Cancioncillas
 2003: Penélope
 2004: Tierra de secreta transparencia
 2007: Mar Cautiva. Edición fascimilar

References

Bibliography

1913 births
2006 deaths
Writers from Havana
Cuban poets
Cuban women poets
20th-century Cuban educators